Alessandro Noselli (born 1 September 1980) is an Italian footballer who plays as a forward.

Club career

Early career
Born in Udine, Friuli, Noselli started his career at hometown club Udinese Calcio. Noselli graduated from Primavera under-20 reserve team in 2000. That transfer window he left for Castel di Sangro of Serie C1. In mid-2001 he left for Avellino, but Noselli failed to play any game.

South Tyrol
In October 2001 Noselli went down to Serie C2 club South Tyrol. Noselli scored a double figure of 10 goals, the first time in his career. In Bolzano, he partnered with another Udine youth product Simone Motta. Udinese turned the deal to co-ownership on 30 August 2002. On that day Udinese bought back Noselli from South Tyrol and re-sold him back to South Tyrol, made South Tyrol was the "active" stakeholder and Udinese was the "passive" one.

Triestina
In June 2003 the co-ownership deal was renewed, and Udinese farmed Noselli to Serie B club Triestina in July 2003. The club was located in Trieste, the capital of Friuli – Venezia Giulia, where city of Udine is also located. Noselli picked no.32 as shirt number. However Noselli failed to enter the starting XI and scored once. Both South Tyrol and Udinese failed to agree a price before the deadline on 23 June, thus they had to submit a bid to Lega Calcio in a sealed envelope. On the next day the league committee announced that South Tyrol outbid Udinese. However the tiny Serie C2 club sold Noselli to Mantova, the champion of Serie C2 Group A.

Mantova
Noselli joined Mantova in mid-2004. Noselli yet to score regularly since leaving the fourth division. In 2004–05 Serie C1, Noselli only scored once. Mantua promoted as the promotion playoffs winner. However Noselli, scored 8 goals in 2005–06 Serie B, with only 18 starts. Noselli spent almost half appearances as substitute and as starter. Noselli also started 3 out of 4 games of the promotion playoffs, losing to Torino. Noselli became more importance in next season, with 28 starts and 7 goals. However, in the last season in 2007–08 Serie B, Noselli made 11 starts in 22 appearances. He also scored twice only. Noselli wore no.32 shirt in his 3 seasons in second division.

Sassuolo
Noselli joined second division newcomer Sassuolo in August 2008 for undisclosed fee, wearing no.18. Noselli also re-joined former team-mate Nicola Donazzan. Noselli scored an impressive 16 Serie B goals, his career high. His attacking partners, Riccardo Zampagna, Gaetano Masucci, Horacio Erpen, scored 11 goals, 4 goals and 3 goals respectively. Noselli also made Sanmarinese internationals Andy Selva became his backup.

Coach Stefano Pioli used either 4–3–3 formation or 4–3–1–2 formation in 2009–10 Serie B. Noselli was the team top-scorer again with 18 goals. In the playoffs Noselli lost to Torino again. Coach used Quadrini – Martinetti – Noselli (Zampagna) in the formation against Turin.

Noselli lost his starting place in 2010–11 Serie B. Neither Masucci nor Noselli were the favourite of the coach. Noselli only made 14 starts in half-season. Daniele Arrigoni (and later Angelo Gregucci) used Martinetti and Quadrini as the starting forwards, plus Masucci and Noselli compete the last place. In January 2011 Masucci left the club and Noselli did not play any more game for the club, (due to injury), instead Salvatore Bruno entered the starting XI. Under care-taker Paolo Mandelli, the coach used 4–4–2 formation, with Andrea Catellani as right winger.

Noselli did not enter the starting XI either under new coach Fulvio Pea. Pea used 3–5–2 formation. Noselli also injured in November.

New York Cosmos

Noselli signed for NASL club New York Cosmos on 17 July 2013.

International career
Noselli represented Italy internationally at youth level. He was capped for the Italy U-16 team in friendlies to prepare for the team's 1997 UEFA European Under-16 Football Championship qualification campaign. However Noselli failed to play in the qualifier.

Honours

Club
New York Cosmos
NASL 2013 Fall Champions
NASL Soccer Bowl 2013

References

External links
 Football.it Profile 
 Lega Serie B Profile 
 FIGC 

Italian footballers
Italian expatriate footballers
Italy youth international footballers
Serie B players
Serie C players
North American Soccer League players
Udinese Calcio players
A.S.D. Castel di Sangro Calcio players
F.C. Südtirol players
U.S. Triestina Calcio 1918 players
Mantova 1911 players
U.S. Sassuolo Calcio players
New York Cosmos (2010) players
Expatriate soccer players in the United States
Association football forwards
Sportspeople from Udine
1980 births
Living people
Italian expatriate sportspeople in the United States
Footballers from Friuli Venezia Giulia